The Palazzo degli Alessandri is a 13th-century palace located in Piazza San Pellegrino number 50 in central Viterbo, Lazio, Italy.

The palace and its towers form a piazza creating a quaint but somewhat Escher-like urban jumble of arches, passageways, and terraces. The palace escaped destruction when the Allessandri fled the city after siding with the Guelph forces. The palace was spared destruction by Pope Innocent IV. When the Alessandri family died, the palace passed on to the Pollini family. The Palace underwent a number of reconstructions, the latest in the last century.

References

Houses completed in the 13th century
Buildings and structures in Viterbo
Palaces in Lazio
Romanesque architecture in Lazio